HD 176871 is a single star in the northern constellation of Lyra, positioned near the southern constellation border with Vulpecula. This object has a blue-white hue and is dimly visible to the naked eye with an apparent visual magnitude of 5.69. It is located at a distance of approximately 790 light years from the Sun based on parallax, and has an absolute magnitude of −0.80. The star is drifting closer with a radial velocity of −20 km/s.

This is a normal B-type main-sequence star with a stellar classification of B5V, which means it is generating energy via core hydrogen fusion. The star is around 11 million years old with 5.4 times the mass of the Sun and is spinning rapidly with a projected rotational velocity of 268 km/s. It is radiating 233 times the luminosity of the Sun from its photosphere at an effective temperature of 10,540 K.

References

B-type main-sequence stars
Lyra (constellation)
Durchmusterung objects
176871
093393
7202